Major-General Cassius Marcellus Clay (October 19, 1810 – July 22, 1903) was an American planter, politician, military officer and abolitionist who served as the United States ambassador to Russia from 1863 to 1869. Born in Kentucky to a wealthy planter family, Clay entered politics during the 1830's and grew to support the abolitionist cause in the U.S., drawing ire from fellow Southerners. A founding member of the Republican Party in Kentucky, he was appointed by President Abraham Lincoln as the U.S. minister to Russia, where Clay is credited with influencing Russian support for the Union during the American Civil War.

Early life, family, and education
Cassius Marcellus Clay was born on October 19, 1810, in Madison County, Kentucky, to Sally Lewis and Green Clay, one of the wealthiest planters and slave owners in Kentucky, who became a prominent politician.  He was one of six children who survived to adulthood, of seven born.

Clay was a member of a large and influential Clay political family.  His older brother Brutus J. Clay became a politician at the state and federal levels.  They were cousins of both Kentucky politician Henry Clay and Alabama governor Clement Comer Clay.  Cassius' sister Elizabeth Lewis Clay (1798–1887) married John Speed Smith, who also became a state and US politician. Their son, Green Clay Smith, became a state politician and was elected to Congress.

The younger Clay attended Transylvania University and then graduated from Yale College in 1832. While at Yale, he heard abolitionist William Lloyd Garrison speak, and his lecture inspired Clay to join the anti-slavery movement. Garrison's arguments were to him "as water is to a thirsty wayfarer." Clay was politically incrementalist, supporting gradual legal change rather than calling for immediate abolition the way Garrison and his supporters did. He thought this more likely to bring success.

Marriage and family
In 1833, Clay married Mary Jane Warfield, daughter of Mary Barr and Dr. Elisha Warfield of Lexington, Kentucky. They had ten children, six of whom lived to adulthood: 
Elisha Warfield Clay (1835–1851)
Green Clay (1837–1883)
Mary Barr Clay (aka Mrs. J. Frank Herrick) (1839–1924)
Sarah "Sallie" Lewis Clay Bennett (1841–1935)
Cassius Marcellus Clay, Jr. (1843–1843)
Cassius Marcellus Clay, Jr. (1845–1857)
Brutus Junius Clay (1847–1932)
Laura Clay (1849–1941)
Flora Clay (1851–1851)
Anne Clay Crenshaw (1859–1945)

Later, he adopted Henry Launey Clay, believed to be his son by an extra-marital relationship while in Russia.

In 1878 after 45 years of marriage, Clay divorced his wife, Mary Jane (Warfield) Clay, claiming abandonment after she no longer would tolerate his marital infidelities. In 1894, the 84-year-old Clay married Dora Richardson, the orphaned sister of one of his sharecropping tenants.  According to newspaper reports at the time, Dora was 15 to 16 years old.  Her age varies in the few extant records; the 1900 US Census indicates that she was born in May 1882, suggesting that she may have been as young as 12 when she married Cassius M. Clay. Her age was a contentious issue, leading the minister who was initially to marry them to bow out.  Clay's children also objected, and Clay reportedly mounted a cannon in his doorway to deter anyone who intended to interfere with the wedding.

Early political career
Cassius Clay was a member of the planter class who later became a prominent anti-slavery crusader. Clay worked toward emancipation, both as a Kentucky state representative and as an early member of the Republican Party.

Clay was elected to three terms in the Kentucky House of Representatives, but he lost support among Kentuckian voters as he promoted abolition. His anti-slavery activism earned him violent enemies. During a political debate in 1843, he survived an assassination attempt by Sam Brown, a hired gun. The scabbard of Clay's Bowie knife was tipped with silver and, in jerking the Bowie knife out in retaliation  pulled this scabbard up so that it was just over his heart. Brown's bullet struck the scabbard and embedded itself in the silver. Despite having been shot in the chest, Clay tackled Brown, and with his Bowie knife removed Brown's nose and one eye and possibly an ear before he threw Brown over an embankment.

In 1845, Clay began publishing an anti-slavery newspaper, True American, in Lexington, Kentucky. Within a month, he received death threats, had to arm himself, and regularly barricaded the armored doors of his newspaper office for protection, besides setting up two four-pounder cannons inside. Shortly afterward, a mob of about 60 men broke into his office and seized his printing equipment. To protect his venture, Clay set up a publication center in Cincinnati, Ohio, a center of abolitionists in the free state  but continued to reside in Kentucky.

Clay served in the Mexican–American War as a captain with the 1st Kentucky Cavalry from 1846 to 1847. He had opposed the annexation of Texas and the expansion of slavery into the Southwest, but had volunteered because of Mexico’s attempt to seize the state, which it still claimed. While making a speech for abolition in 1849, Clay was attacked by the six Turner brothers, who beat, stabbed, and tried to shoot him. In the ensuing fight, Clay fought off all six and, using his Bowie knife, killed Cyrus Turner.

In 1853, Clay granted 10 acres of his expansive lands to John G. Fee, an abolitionist who founded the town of Berea. In 1855 Fee founded Berea College, open to all races. Clay's connections to the northern antislavery movement remained strong. He was a founder of the Republican Party in Kentucky and became a friend of Abraham Lincoln, whom he supported for the presidency in 1860. Clay was briefly a candidate for the vice presidency at the 1860 Republican National Convention, but lost the nomination to Hannibal Hamlin.

Civil War and Minister to Russia

President Lincoln appointed Clay to the post of Minister to the Russian court at St. Petersburg on March 28, 1861. The Civil War started before he departed and, as there were no Federal troops in Washington at the time, Clay organized a group of 300 volunteers to protect the White House and US Naval Yard from a possible Confederate attack. These men became known as Cassius M. Clay's Washington Guards. President Lincoln gave Clay a presentation Colt revolver in recognition. When Federal troops arrived, Clay and his family embarked for Russia. As Minister to Russia, Clay witnessed the Tsar's emancipation edict.

During the Civil War, Russia came to the aid of the Union, threatening war against Britain and France if they officially recognized the Confederacy. Cassius Clay, as minister to Russia during that time, was instrumental in securing Russia's aid. Emperor Alexander II of Russia gave sealed orders to the commanders of both his Atlantic and Pacific fleets, and sent them to the East and West coasts of the United States. They were instructed that the sealed orders were to be opened only if Britain and France entered the war on the side of the Confederacy. When the Russian Atlantic fleet entered New York harbor, Secretary of the Navy Gideon Welles wrote in his diary:

In sending these ships to this country, there is something significant. What will be its effect on France, and French policy, we shall learn in due time. It may be moderate, it may exacerbate. God bless the Russians.

The action of Alexander II was confirmed in 1904 by Wharton Barker of Pennsylvania, who in 1878 was the financial agent in the United States of the Russian government.

Recalled to the United States in 1862 to accept a commission from Lincoln as a major general with the Union Army, Clay publicly refused to accept it unless Lincoln would agree to emancipate slaves under Confederate control. Clay was nonetheless commissioned a Major General of the US Volunteers General Staff on April 11, 1862, and Lincoln sent him to Kentucky to assess the mood for emancipation there and in the other border states. Following Clay's return to Washington, D.C., Lincoln issued the Emancipation Proclamation in late 1862, to take effect in January 1863.

Clay resigned his commission on March 11, 1863, and returned to Russia, where he served until 1869.  For his service in the Civil War, Clay received a pension noting his service as a Major General of Volunteers, as well as his service in the Mexican War. He was influential in the negotiations for the purchase of Alaska.

Later years
Later, Clay founded the Cuban Charitable Aid Society to help the Cuban independence movement of José Martí. He also spoke in favor of nationalizing the railroads and later against the power being accrued by industrialists. Clay left the Republican Party in 1869. He also disapproved of the Republican Radicals' reconstruction policy after Lincoln's assassination.

In 1872, Clay was one of the organizers of the Liberal Republican revolt. He was instrumental in securing the nomination of Horace Greeley for the presidency. In the political campaigns of 1876 and 1880, Clay supported the Democratic Party candidates. He rejoined the Republican party in the campaign of 1884.

Clay had a reputation as a rebel and a fighter. Due to threats on his life, he had become accustomed to carrying two pistols and a knife for protection. He installed a cannon to protect his home and office. At the 1890 Kentucky Constitutional Convention, Clay was elected by the members as the Convention's President. Cassius Clay died at his home on July 22, 1903, of "general exhaustion." He was 92 years old. Survivors included his daughters, Laura Clay and Mary Barr Clay, who were both women's rights activists.

Legacy

His family home, White Hall, is maintained by the Commonwealth of Kentucky as White Hall State Historic Shrine.

Herman Heaton Clay, a descendant of African-American slaves, named his son Cassius Marcellus Clay, who was born nine years after the death of the emancipationist, in tribute to him. This Cassius Clay gave his own son the same name, Cassius M. Clay, Jr., a world heavyweight champion boxer who gained international renown and changed his name to Muhammad Ali after his conversion to Islam. After Ali converted to Islam he claimed that his earlier name was a "slave name" and added that "I didn't choose it and I don't want it." He further asserted in his autobiography that while Clay may have gotten rid of his slaves, he "held on to white supremacy." This led Ali to conclude: "Why should I keep my white slavemaster's name visible and my black ancestors invisible, unknown, unhonored?"

Writings
 
 The Writings of Cassius Marcellus Clay (edited with a memoir by Horace Greeley. New York, 1848)

See also

 Lucy Walker steamboat disaster
 Clay family

References

Attribution

Further reading

 
 
 
  (historical fiction)
 
 
 
 
 
  (originally delivered as an address before the Chicago Civil War Round Table, October 17, 1952.)

External links
 
 White Hall-Clermont Foundation, official website
 White Hall – home of Cassius M. Clay, Kentucky Parks
 Original Letters: Abraham Lincoln to Cassius Marcellus Clay, 1860, Shapell Manuscript Foundation
 Cassius M. Clay biography, Kentucky Educational Television
 "Cassius M. Clay", Columbia Encyclopedia 6th Edition, online at Bartleby website

1810 births
1903 deaths
American abolitionists
American shooting survivors
People from Madison County, Kentucky
Yale College alumni
Republican Party members of the Kentucky House of Representatives
American people of English descent
Ambassadors of the United States to Russia
Transylvania University alumni
Writers from Kentucky
Kentucky Liberal Republicans
19th-century American diplomats
19th-century American newspaper publishers (people)
American military personnel of the Mexican–American War
Union Army generals
Green Clay family
Centre College alumni